Victoria Lederberg (July 7, 1937 – December 29, 2002) was a justice of the Rhode Island Supreme Court from 1993 to 2002. Before her appointment, Lederberg was a member of the Rhode Island House of Representatives from 1974 to 1983 and the Rhode Island Senate from 1985 to 1991. In 2003, she was posthumously inducted into the Rhode Island Heritage Hall of Fame.

Early life and education
Lederberg was born on July 7, 1937 in Providence, Rhode Island, US. She graduated from Brown University with a Doctor of Philosophy in 1966 and a Juris Doctor from Suffolk University Law School in 1976.

Career
In 1968, Lederberg began her career as a psychology professor at Rhode Island College. She became a member of the Rhode Island House of Representatives in 1974 and became a lawyer in 1976.
As a politician, Lederberg remained with the House of Representatives until 1983. She was elected to the Rhode Island Senate in 1985 and was with the Senate until 1991. For her judicial career, Lederberg worked for the Providence Municipal Court before being named to the Rhode Island Supreme Court in 1993.

Apart from her tenures, Lederberg ran for Secretary of State of Rhode Island in 1982 but lost to Susan Farmer. In 1990, Lederberg was one of the candidates running for mayor of Providence. Before the Democratic primary in Rhode Island, she participated in a competition where she and the other candidates became mayor of a virtual version of Providence in SimCity. During her play session, Lederberg converted a power plant from conventional fuel to nuclear, built numerous police stations and accidentally demolished a church. At the 1990 primary, Lederberg lost to Andrew Annaldo after an election recount was made.

Awards and honors
Lederberg was posthumously inducted into the Rhode Island Heritage Hall of Fame in 2003.

Personal life and death
Lederberg was married and had two children. She died on December 29, 2002, in Providence from a heart attack.

References

1937 births
2002 deaths
Lawyers from Providence, Rhode Island
Politicians from Providence, Rhode Island
Rhode Island College faculty
Justices of the Rhode Island Supreme Court
Members of the Rhode Island House of Representatives
Rhode Island state senators
Brown University alumni
Suffolk University Law School alumni
Women state legislators in Rhode Island
20th-century American politicians
20th-century American judges
20th-century American lawyers
20th-century American women politicians
American women academics
20th-century American women judges
21st-century American women judges
21st-century American judges